Maria Gonzaga may refer to:
 Maria Gonzaga, Duchess of Montferrat
 Marie Louise Gonzaga, Queen of Poland and Grand Duchess of Lithuania